Berea–Midpark High School (BMHS) is a public high school in Berea, Ohio, United States, and is the only high school in the Berea City School District. The school was formed in 2013 from a consolidation of Berea High School and Midpark High School due to declining enrollment. It is located on a campus immediately east of Baldwin Wallace University and is housed in a building that opened in August 2020. 

Previously, BMHS was housed in the former Berea High School building on the same campus. That building opened in 1929 with additions in 1954, 1964, and 1995, and was demolished between August and November of 2020. As of the 2020–21 school year, BMHS has approximately 1,600 students in grades 9 through 12. Athletic teams are known as the Titans, and the school colors are blue and orange, with the blue coming from Berea High School and the orange from Midpark High School.

References

External links

Public high schools in Ohio
Berea, Ohio
High schools in Cuyahoga County, Ohio
2013 establishments in Ohio